The team eventing event at the 2020 Summer Olympics is scheduled to take place from 30 July to 2 August 2021 at the Baji Koen and Sea Forest Cross-Country Course. Like all other equestrian events, the eventing competition is open-gender, with both male and female athletes competing in the same division. 45 riders (15 teams of 3) from 15 nations are expected to compete.

Background

This will be the 25th appearance of the event, which has been held at every Summer Olympics since it was introduced in 1912.

The reigning Olympic champion is France (Karim Laghouag, Thibaut Vallette, Mathieu Lemoine, and Astier Nicolas). The reigning (2018) World Champion is Great Britain (Rosalind Canter, Piggy French, Tom McEwen, and Gemma Tattersall).

An Olympics.com preview of equestrian (all events) provided the following overview:

Qualification

A National Olympic Committee (NOC) could enter 1 team of 3 riders in the team eventing. Quota places are allocated to the NOC, which selects the riders. There were 15 team quota places available, allocated as follows:

 Host nation: Japan was guaranteed a team
 World Games: The top 6 teams at the 2018 FEI World Equestrian Games, excluding Japan
 European Championships: The top 2 teams from the 2019 FEI European Championships, in geographic groups A and B (Northwest and Southwest Europe)
 Group C event: The top team from a group C (Central Europe, Eastern Europe, and Central Asia) qualification event
 Pan American Games: The top 2 teams from the 2019 Pan-American Games, with groups D and E covering North, Central, and South America
 Groups F/G event: The top 2 teams from a groups F and G (Africa, Middle East, Southeast Asia, Oceania) qualification event
 Nations Cup: The top team from the 2019 Eventing Nations Cup Final, changed to the highest ranked team in the 2019 Eventing Nations Cup Series

Competition format

The eventing competition features all 45 riders competing in three rounds (dressage, cross-country, and jumping). Scores from all 3 riders on each team are summed to give a team score; the number of team members was reduced from 4 in 2016 to 3, with there no longer being a dropped score.

 Dressage test: A shortened dressage competition, with penalties based on the dressage score
 Cross-country test: A race over a 4.5 kilometre cross-country course. The time allotted is 8 minutes (570 metres per minute), with penalties assessed for exceeding that time. There are a maximum of 38 obstacles, with penalties assessed for faults. Staggered starts.
 Jumping test: A 600-metre show jumping course, with 11 or 12 obstacles (including double and triple jumps, with a maximum of 16 jumps total). Maximum height of obstacles is 1.25 metres. The required speed is 375 metres/minute (time limit of 1:36). Penalties are assessed for exceeding the time limit and for faults at the obstacles.

Schedule

The event takes place over four days, with two days for the dressage followed by cross-country and jumping on the next two days.

All times are Japan Standard Time (UTC+9).

Results

Standings after dressage 

At the end of the two days of dressage, Olympic champions Germany and World champions Great Britain had already broken away from the pack, with Germany, for the first time since 2008, not in the lead after the first discipline

Standings after cross-country 

Germany suffered a nightmare cross country, with over 34 points in penalties all but knocking them out of medal contention, and ending the defense of their Olympic title. Great Britain, by contrast, backed up their earlier excellent dressage work with a faultless cross-country, posting three of only seven clear rounds all day, which gave them a huge 18 point lead going into the final discipline, the showjumping, equivalent to four posts down. Australia and France took advantage of Germany's disaster yo move into medal position, and clear of the pack.

Final standings (after jumping)

Despite three clear rounds from the defending champions Germany lifting them to fourth, the medal positions remained unchanged as Great Britain won Olympic team eventing gold for the first time since 1972. a gap of 49 years. Australia took silver, with France taking the bronze medals.

References

Team eventing